Interleukin 1 receptor, type II (IL-1R2) also known as CD121b (Cluster of Differentiation 121b) is an interleukin receptor. IL1R2 also denotes its human gene.

Function 

The protein encoded by this gene is a decoy receptor for certain cytokines that belongs to the interleukin-1 receptor family. This protein binds interleukin-1α (IL1A), interleukin-1β (IL1B), and interleukin 1 receptor antagonist (IL1Ra), preventing them from binding to their regular receptors and thereby inhibiting the transduction of their signaling. IL-1R2 protein also interacts non-productively with the second component of the signaling IL-1 receptor, namely IL-1RAcP, and a complex of the IL-1R2 and IL-1RAcP extracellular domains with interleukin-1 beta has been solved by X-ray crystallography. Interleukin 4 (IL4) is reported to antagonize the activity of interleukin 1 by inducing the expression and release of this cytokine. This gene and three other genes form a cytokine receptor gene cluster on chromosome 2q12. Two alternatively spliced transcript variants encoding the same protein have been reported.

See also 
 Cluster of differentiation
 Interleukin 1 receptor, type I

References

Further reading

External links 
 

Immunoglobulin superfamily cytokine receptors
Clusters of differentiation